The G.W. Reed Travellers Home is a historic house and former inn in the Benton Falls village of Benton, Maine.  It is a two-story wood-frame building, constructed about 1813, with an older house attached as an ell to the rear.  It was built by David Reed, and served as a stop for travellers on the road running on the south side of the Sebasticook River, and as a meeting point for local militia.  It was listed on the National Register of Historic Places in 1982.

See also
National Register of Historic Places listings in Kennebec County, Maine

References

Houses on the National Register of Historic Places in Maine
National Register of Historic Places in Kennebec County, Maine
Federal architecture in Maine
Houses completed in 1790
Houses in Kennebec County, Maine